Quercus coffeicolor is a species of oak. It is native to Nayarit, Sinaloa, and Jalisco in western Mexico.

Trelease in 1924 simultaneously published three names for what nearly all present-day botanists consider to be one species. Some publications have referred to this taxon as Quercus prainiana but this name turns out to have been used earlier, in 1913, applied to an Asian species now called Quercus helferiana. Hence this name is not available for the Mexican trees. Instead, more recent authors been using one of Trelease's other names, Quercus coffeicolor.

The species is placed in section Lobatae.

Description
The leaves are elliptical, up to 12 cm long, wavy edges but no teeth or lobes.

References

External links
 photo of herbarium specimen at Missouri Botanical Garden, collected in Sinaloa in 1897

coffeicolor
Trees of Northwestern Mexico
Trees of Southwestern Mexico
Plants described in 1824
Flora of the Sierra Madre Occidental
Taxa named by William Trelease